The tuberosity of the ulna is a rough eminence on the proximal end of the ulna. It occurs at the junction of the antero-inferior surface of the coronoid process with the front of the body. It provides an insertion point to a tendon of the brachialis (the oblique cord of the brachialis is attached to the lateral border).

References

External links

Additional images

Ulna